The Election Offences Act 1954 is a Malaysian law which enacted to prevent electoral offences and corrupt and illegal practices at elections; to provide for the establishment of enforcement teams and for matters connected therewith; to provide for the appointment of election agents and to control election expenses; and to provide for election petitions.

Structure
The Election Offences Act 1954, in its current form (1 January 2006), consists of 7 Parts containing 42 sections and 2 schedules (including 29 amendments).
 Part I: Preliminary and Interpretation
 Part II: Electoral Offences
 Part III: Corrupt Practices
 Part IV: Election Agent, Election Expenses and Illegal Practices
 Part IVA: Enforcement Team
 Part V: Excuse for Corrupt or Illegal Practice
 Part VI: Grounds for Avoiding Elections
 Part VII: Election Petitions
 Schedules

Footnotes

References

External links
 Election Offences Act 1954 

1954 in Malaya
Legal history of British Malaya
1954 in law
Malaysian federal legislation
Elections in Malaysia